Owl Peak is in the northern Teton Range, Grand Teton National Park, Wyoming and is just east of Elk Mountain.  The peak is located west of and across Jackson Lake from Lizard Creek Campground. Access to the peak is easiest by boat to the Berry Creek Trailhead at Wilcox Point then heading west at the Owl Creek Trail. After a  hike along Berry Creek and Owl Creek trails, off trail access to the summit can be achieved after a steep ascent of an additional . North of the mountain, the Tetons blend into the Yellowstone Plateau while to the south lies Webb Canyon.

References

Mountains of Grand Teton National Park
Mountains of Wyoming
Mountains of Teton County, Wyoming